This is a list of number-one hits in the Czech Republic by decade from the Rádio Top 100 Oficiální chart which is compiled weekly by IFPI Czech Republic.

2000s
2010s
2020s

References